Hans Jørgen Gundersen (11 August 1850 – ?) was a Norwegian consul.

He was born at sea, in the North Sea, as a son of shipmaster Peter Fredrik Gundersen and his wife Mathilde Susanne Larsen. In 1881 he married Sara Elisabeth Rerg. Their son Gunnar Gundersen became an internationally known chess player with Australian citizenship.

Gundersen finished his secondary education in Trondhjem in 1868 and graduated from the Royal Frederick University with the cand.jur. degree in 1871. He started his career in merchantry in France, then England. From 1879 Gundersen served as a vice consul in Bordeaux. He then worked in the consulate-general in London from 1886 to 1887 before being named a consul in Melbourne. In 1907 he became consul in Cardiff.

In 1897–1898 Gundersen funded and equipped an expedition to Kerguelen. He brought with him the ornithologist Robert Hall and several others on the brig Edward, leaving in October 1897 and spending 53 days at Kerguelen. The island was rich on seal and birds. The expedition was not an unequivocal financial success, as it was reported that "the 'take', comprising 19,000 gallons of blubber and 900 skins is barely expected to cover the cost of hiring and outfitting the vessel for the trip". It was more successful from an ornithological angle.

Gundersen was decorated as a Knight, First Class of the Order of St. Olav (1910) and the Order of Vasa.

References

1850 births
Year of death missing
People from Trondheim
University of Oslo alumni
Norwegian expatriates in France
Norwegian expatriates in the United Kingdom
Norwegian expatriates in Australia
Knights of the Order of Vasa
People born at sea